All visitors to Sri Lanka must obtain a visa either on arrival to Sri Lanka or in advance. Most visitors entering for tourism purposes are required to obtain an Electronic Travel Authorization (ETA) in order to receive a visa on arrival, unless they are exempt from obtaining one. However, nationals of some countries must obtain a visa in advance instead of an ETA before being allowed to enter Sri Lanka. All visitors must hold a passport valid for 6 months.

Visa policy map

Free visa on arrival
On the basis of reciprocity, citizens of the following three countries are exempt from the requirement to obtain an ETA for Sri Lanka. They are entitled to receive a gratis visa free of charge, on arrival at any port of entry:

Electronic travel authorisation
Nationals of most other countries except the ETA-exempt countries and countries whose citizens require a visa in advance may obtain an ETA either on arrival to Sri Lanka or online; however, visitors are encouraged to obtain the ETA online in order to avoid lengthy delays at the port of entry. Holders of an ETA can then obtain a visa on arrival to Sri Lanka by presenting their ETA and passport to a Sri Lankan immigration officer. A visa obtained on arrival is valid for 30 days, but can be extended up to 180 days. Business purpose ETAs can only be obtained from one of the Sri Lankan diplomatic missions around the world, as well as the head office of the Department of Immigration and Emigration.

ETA restrictions

History
The Sri Lankan Government announced a plan to allow citizens of certain countries to enter Sri Lanka without a visa for stays up to six-months from 1 May 2019, for a trial period of six months. There was also a plan to extend the facility to countries of the South Asian Association for Regional Cooperation and China in the future. This program was suspended following the 2019 Sri Lanka Easter bombings.

A modified version of the plan was implemented on 1 August 2019. From 1 August 2019 to 30 April 2020 (initially 31 January 2020), nationals of the following countries who were travelling as tourists were exempt from the ETA processing fee, and thus could have obtained an ETA free of charge:

*: Singaporeans remain exempt from the requirement to obtain an ETA.

Non-ordinary passports
Holders of diplomatic, official, service or special passports of the following countries are granted a gratis visa free of charge, on arrival in Sri Lanka, depending on nationality:

D — diplomatic passports
O — official passports
S — service passports
Sp - special passports
PA - passports endorsed for "public affairs"

Visa required in advance
Nationals of the following 8 jurisdictions are ineligible to apply for an ETA independently, and thus must obtain a visa in advance from one of the Sri Lankan diplomatic missions around the world: 

1 - May apply for an ETA at the head office of the Department of Immigration and Emigration through a Sri Lankan sponsor.

Entry restrictions
Nationals of the following 7 countries are specifically required to hold return or onward tickets in order to enter Sri Lanka:

North Korea

Statistics

See also

Visa requirements for Sri Lankan citizens
Tourism in Sri Lanka
Foreign relations of Sri Lanka
Sri Lankan passport

References

External links
 Ministry of Foreign Affairs
 Department of Immigration and Emigration
 Electronic Travel Authorization (ETA)

Sri Lanka
Tourism in Sri Lanka